Chariesthes maublanci is a species of beetle in the family Cerambycidae. It was described by Lepesme and Stephan von Breuning in 1950. It is known from Gabon.

References

Endemic fauna of Gabon
Chariesthes
Beetles described in 1950